John Gooch (c. 1752 – 1823) was an Anglican priest, Archdeacon of Sudbury from his installation on 20 October 1784 until his death on 14 July 1823.

The son of Sir Thomas Gooch, 3rd Baronet, he was born at Benacre, Suffolk on 26 May 1752. He was educated at Christ Church, Oxford, where he matriculated in 1769, aged 17, and graduated B.A. in 1773, M.A. in 1776. For many years he held the livings of Saxlingham and Benacre.

Notes

References
 cites:

External links
 — Family tree
 — Brief biography of his son

1750s births
1823 deaths
19th-century English Anglican priests
18th-century English Anglican priests
Alumni of Christ Church, Oxford
Archdeacons of Sudbury
People from Waveney District